The Tico salamander (Bolitoglossa tica) is a species of salamander in the family Plethodontidae. It is native to Costa Rica.

Its natural habitat includes subtropical to tropical montane forests.
It is threatened by habitat loss.

References

Bolitoglossa
Endemic fauna of Costa Rica
Amphibians described in 2008